Ijrud-e Bala Rural District is in the Central District of Ijrud County, Zanjan province, Iran. At the National Census of 2006, its population was 10,025 in 2,342 households. There were 10,768 inhabitants in 3,017 households at the following census of 2011. At the most recent census of 2016, the population of the rural district was 10,570 in 3,179 households. The largest of its 17 villages was Aghol Beyk-e Sofla, with 1,155 people.

References 

Ijrud County

Rural Districts of Zanjan Province

Populated places in Zanjan Province

Populated places in Ijrud County